Vahagn or Vahakn, also known as Vahagn Vishapakagh, is a warrior god in Armenian mythology. Scholars consider him to be either the thunder, or sun and fire god of the pre-Christian Armenian pantheon, as well as the god of war, bravery and victory. He formed a triad with Aramazd and Anahit. Vahagn is etymologically derived from *Varhraγn, the Parthian name for the Indo-Iranian god Verethragna, although there are key differences between the two deities.

Vahagn was worshipped at a tripartite temple complex together with his bride Astghik and the goddess Anahit in the district of Taron, on the slopes of a mountain called Karke near the settlement of Ashtishat. After Armenia came under Hellenistic influence in antiquity, Vahagn was identified with the Hellnic deity Heracles, but also rarely with Apollo.

Name 
The theonym Vahagn is cognates with Verethragna, the name of the Indo-Iranian god of victory mentioned in Avesta, as well as the Vedic Vŗtrahan, the usual epithet of the thunder god Indra. It was borrowed into Armenian from Parthian *Varhraγn and developed from the earlier form *Varhagn. In the old Armenian calendar, the twenty-seventh day of the month was called Vahagn. Additionally, the planet Mars was called Atraher ("fire-hair") by the ancient Armenians in reference to Vahagn. Today, Vahagn is used as a male given name among Armenians.

Historical attestations 
Vahagn is mentioned in a number of Classical Armenian written sources. For example, in the history attributed to Agathangelos, Armenian king Tiridates III evokes the triad of Aramazd, Anahit and Vahagn in a greeting to his people: "May health and prosperity come to you by the help of the gods, rich fullness from manly Aramazd, providence from Anahit the Lady, and bravery come to you from brave Vahagn."

Historian Movses Khorenatsi refers to Vahagn as one of the sons of Tigranes (a mythologized composite figure of several Armenian kings in Khorenatsi's history) and records the following song about him: 

Khorenatsi does not give the rest of the song, but states that it tells of how Vahagn fought and conquered vishaps, which are the dragons of Armenian mythology. This attribute of Vahagn is the reason for his title vishapakagh, meaning "reaper of vishaps" or "dragon-reaper."

The 7th-century Armenian author Anania Shirakatsi relates a myth where Vahagn steals some straw from Barsham (i.e., Baalshamin) and drops it on his way back, creating the Milky Way. This is supposed to be the origin of one of the folk names of the Milky Way in Armenian, Hardagoghi chanaparh, literally "the way of the straw-thief."

Temple 
The chief temple of Vahagn at Ashtishat on the slopes of Mount Karke was often called the Vahevanean or Vahevahean temple because its priests were members of the Vahevuni or Vahnuni noble house, who claimed descent from Vahagn. Vahagn was worshipped jointly at the temple together with Anahit and Astghik. According to Agathangelos, after King Tiridates III's conversion to Christianity in the early fourth century, the first head of the Armenian Church Gregory the Illuminator went to Ashtishat and destroyed the temple of Vahagn. A church was constructed on the site of the destroyed temple, which became the first Mother See of the Armenian Church.

Interpretations and comparative mythology 
Georges Dumézil noted that Vahagn seems closer to the Vedic Vŗtrahan Indra than the Avestan Verethragna, since the former is depicted as a dragon/serpent-slayer like Vahagn, while the latter is not. Vahagn has frequently been regarded as a counterpart of Indra, but Armen Petrosyan considers the similarities between the two to be underlying Indo-European commonalities rather than the result of direct borrowing, since in that case the dissimilarity with Verethragna would be inexplicable. Philologist Vyacheslav Ivanov considered the Song of Vahagn recorded by Khorenatsi to be "one of the striking examples of Indo-European poetry." In Ivanov's view, the myth of Vahagn contains several layers, including the later Iranian myth of Verethragna and an earlier Indo-European layer of a god persecuting the enemy. Armen Petrosyan considers Vahagn to be a pre-Iranian Armenian god who took on an Iranian name, rather than a complete borrowing. Petrosyan has also drawn parallels between Vahagn and the Vedic fire deity Agni, based on similarities in the accounts of their birth. Vahagn may have acquired his attribute of dragon-slayer from the Hurro-Urartian deity Teshub.

Vahagn was identified with Heracles during the Hellenistic period. In the 5th-century Armenian translation of the Bible, Vahagn is used to translate Heracles in 2 Maccabees 4:19, while Khorenatsi states that the song of Vahagn tells of heroic deeds reminiscent of Heracles. More rarely, he was identified with the sun god Apollo. John the Baptist has been called the "Christian heir of Vahagn's character," as a church dedicated to him was built near the demolished temple of Vahagn.

References

Bibliography

Further reading

 A History of Armenia (Armenian Mythology) by Vahan M. Kurkjian. Published by the Armenian General Benevolent Union of America 1958/YR.

See also 
Astłik
Hayk

Armenian gods
Fire gods
Thunder gods
War gods